"All You Ever Wanted" is a song by English singer-songwriter Rag'n'Bone Man. It was released as a digital download and for streaming on 29 January 2021 as the lead single from his second studio album Life by Misadventure. The song was written by Ben Jackson-Cook, Mike Elizondo, Natalie Hemby and Rory Graham.

Background
Talking about the song, he said, "I'd felt sad looking around Brighton and London where I grew up…remembering all those cool places that aren't there anymore." The song was recorded in Tennessee and was co-written and produced with his longtime collaborator Ben Jackson-Cook and Mike Elizondo.

Music video
A music video to accompany the release of "All You Ever Wanted" was first released onto YouTube on 29 January 2021. The video was directed by Will Hooper.

Personnel
Credits adapted from Tidal.

 Ben Jackson-Cook – producer, composer, lyricist
 Mike Elizondo – producer, composer, lyricist, electric guitar, programmer, synthesizer
 Rory Graham – producer, composer, lyricist, vocal
 Natalie Hemby – composer, lyricist
 Wendy Melvoin – acoustic guitar
 Erica Block – assistant engineer
 Jaime Sickora – assistant engineer
 Zachary Stokes – assistant engineer
 Bill Banwell – bass
 Daru Jones – drums
 Lawson White – engineer
 Chris Gehringer – mastering engineer
 Shawn Everett – mixing engineer

Charts

Release history

References

2021 songs
2021 singles
Rag'n'Bone Man songs